Francesco Gozzadini (died 1673) was a Roman Catholic prelate who served as Bishop of Cefalonia e Zante (1654–1673).

Biography
On 2 Mar 1654, Francesco Gozzadini was appointed during the papacy of Pope Innocent X as Bishop of Cefalonia e Zante.
On 22 Mar 1654, he was consecrated bishop by Marcantonio Franciotti, Cardinal-Priest of Santa Maria della Pace, with Giovanni Alfonso Puccinelli, Archbishop of Manfredonia, and Thomas Tomassoni, Bishop of Umbriatico, serving as co-consecrators. 
He served as Bishop of Cefalonia e Zante until his death on 16 Feb 1673.

References 

17th-century Roman Catholic bishops in the Republic of Venice
Bishops appointed by Pope Innocent X
1673 deaths